Hryhoriy Mykhailovych Tiutiunnyk (born 23 April 1920 in Shylivka, Poltava Governorate, Ukrainian SSR – died 29 August 1961 in Lviv, Ukrainian SSR of the Soviet Union) was a Ukrainian lyric poet, writer.

His brother was the writer Hryhir Tiutiunnyk.

References

External links
 Hryhoriy Tiutiunyk in the Ukrainian Soviet Encyclopedia
 Nakonechna, S. And their pines still make noise. Ukrayina Moloda. 20 September 2006

1920 births
1961 deaths
People from Poltava Oblast
People from Poltava Governorate
Ukrainian writers
Ukrainian poets
National University of Kharkiv alumni
Recipients of the Shevchenko National Prize
Burials at Lychakiv Cemetery